Caroline Harker (born 1966) is an English stage and television actress, sister of actresses Nelly Harker and Susannah Harker, and daughter of actors Polly Adams and Richard Owens. She and her sisters are descended from theatrical designer Joseph Harker.

She is known for her roles as Celia in the BBC's Middlemarch, and as Woman Police Constable (WPC) (later Detective Sgt.) Hazel Wallace in the ITV police drama A Touch of Frost (1992-2003).

She also played Alicia Davenport in Coronation Street for four episodes in 2012.

Harker played the role of 'mother' in the Mike Kenny's adaptation of The Railway Children, directed by Damian Cruden and staged at the Waterloo International railway station. Harker is married to fellow actor Anthony Calf, with whom she appeared in The Madness of King George and in a TV adaptation of Jilly Cooper's Riders They have three daughters.

Filmography

References

External links

Caroline Harker's Filmography

1966 births
English television actresses
Living people
English stage actresses
Place of birth missing (living people)
Caroline